The 1979 South Pacific Games, held at Suva in Fiji from 28 August to 8 September 1979, was the sixth edition of the South Pacific Games.

Participating countries
Nineteen Pacific nations or territories attended:

Sports
There were 18 sports contested at the 1979 South Pacific Games:

Note: A number in parentheses indicates how many medal events were contested in that sport (where known).

Final medal table
New Caledonia topped the table again:

See also
Athletics at the 1979 South Pacific Games
Football at the 1979 South Pacific Games

Notes
 For the 1979 Games, 19 countries and a projected 2,672 athletes took part.

 Eighteen sports as reported in Pacific Islands Monthly. The newly introduced sports were: cricket, hockey, lawn bowls, and squash.

 Netball: In Pacific Islands Monthly (PIM), it was reported that "Papua New Guinea took the bronze" in the 1979 netball competition, behind Fiji and Cook Islands. However, a few pages later in PIM's results for the netball, Tonga is listed as finishing in third place.

 Swimming: There were either 24 or 23 events on the programme, depending on whether the men's 4 × 200 m freestyle relay was contested and officially included in the medals. A publication from Guam's Political Status Education Coordinating Commission claims that Guam swimmer Hollis Kimbrough, "won a record seven medals in the '79 SPG alone", and as such, the Pacific Islands Monthly results could be incomplete as only four medals are listed for Kimbrough there plus two men's relay medals for Guam – and the men's 4 × 200 is omitted.

 Table tennis: There were seven events on the programme (or perhaps only six or five, depending on whether the respective team competitions for men and women were played and medals officially awarded). The five events for table tennis in the list of results from the November 1979 issue of Pacific Islands Monthly (PIM) are the mixed doubles, men's and women's singles and doubles. PIM reported earlier in the same issue that Fiji had won the women's team event (as well as the women's doubles), but neither women's or men's team events appear in the PIM results.

 Weightlifting: Ten men's weight divisions were contested, with one medal event only per division (for the maximum total lift of snatch + clean-and-jerk).

References

Sources

Pacific Games by year
Pacific Games
P
 
1979 in Fijian sport
International sports competitions hosted by Fiji
August 1979 sports events in Oceania
September 1979 sports events in Oceania